William McGill Kenville (December 1, 1930 – June 19, 2018) was an American professional basketball player born from Elmhurst, New York.

A 6'2" (1.88 m) guard from St. Bonaventure University, Kenville played six seasons (1953–1958; 1959–1960) in the National Basketball Association as a member of the Syracuse Nationals and Fort Wayne/Detroit Pistons.  He averaged 7.1 points per game and won a league title with Syracuse in 1955.

References

External links

1930 births
2018 deaths
American men's basketball players
Basketball players from New York City
Detroit Pistons players
Fort Wayne Pistons players
People from Elmhurst, Queens
Point guards
Shooting guards
Sportspeople from Queens, New York
St. Bonaventure Bonnies men's basketball players
Syracuse Nationals draft picks
Syracuse Nationals players